Scott McAllister (born 1969) is an American composer and clarinetist.

Born in Vero Beach, Florida, McAllister received a DMA from Rice University. He is particularly noted for his pieces featuring clarinet, including Black Dog (based on hard rock, particularly the music of Led Zeppelin), X Concerto, and Freebirds. McAllister currently teaches at Baylor University in Waco, Texas.

References

1969 births
American male composers
21st-century American composers
American clarinetists
People from Vero Beach, Florida
Musicians from Florida
Rice University alumni
Living people
21st-century clarinetists
21st-century American male musicians